István Encsi (born 1 February 1943) is a Hungarian athlete. He competed in the men's hammer throw at the 1972 Summer Olympics.

References

External links
 

1943 births
Living people
Athletes (track and field) at the 1972 Summer Olympics
Hungarian male hammer throwers
Olympic athletes of Hungary
Sportspeople from Borsod-Abaúj-Zemplén County
20th-century Hungarian people